Scott Lipsky and David Martin won the doubles competition in January 2009 and were the defending champions, but chose not to participate.
Harsh Mankad and Frederik Nielsen defeated 6–4, 6–4 Carsten Ball and Travis Rettenmaier in the final.

Seeds

Draw

Draw

External links
 Doubles Draw

USTA LA Tennis Open - Doubles
USTA LA Tennis Open